"Big Poppa" is a 1994 song by American rapper The Notorious B.I.G. 

Big Poppa may also refer to:
 Nickname for The Notorious B.I.G. (1972–1997)
 Big Poppa E, American performer of slam poetry
 Big Poppa Pump, 1998–1999 ring name of professional wrestler Scott Steiner (born Scott Rechsteiner 1962)

See also
 Big Papi, nickname of Dominican-American baseball player David Ortiz (born 1975)
 Big Daddy (disambiguation)